Kagisano–Molopo Local Municipality is a local municipality in the Dr Ruth Segomotsi Mompati District Municipality, in the North West province of South Africa. It was created at the local government elections of 18 May 2011 by merging the Kagisano and Molopo municipalities.

Geography
It borders on the Kgalagadi District of the Republic of Botswana to the north, Moshaweng Local Municipality in the Northern Cape province to the south-west, Greater Taung Local Municipality to the south, Naledi Local Municipality to the south-east, and Ratlou Local Municipality to the east. The main towns in the municipality are Ganyesa, Pomfret, Morokweng and Piet Plessis.

Demographics
According to the 2011 census, the municipality has a population of 105,789. The majority of this population, 96.0%, described themselves as "Black African"; there are small minorities of those who describe themselves as "White" (2.1%) and "Coloured" (1.4%). 90.3% of the population speak Setswana as a first language, while 3.4% speak Afrikaans and 1.6% speak English.

Politics

The municipal council consists of twenty-nine members elected by mixed-member proportional representation. Fifteen councillors are elected by first-past-the-post voting in fifteen wards, while the remaining fourteen are chosen from party lists so that the total number of party representatives is proportional to the number of votes received. In the election of 1 November 2021 the African National Congress (ANC) obtained a majority of twenty seats on the council.

The following table shows the results of the 2021 election.

Main places
The 2001 census divided the municipality into the following main places:

Notes and references

External links
 Official website

Local municipalities of the Dr Ruth Segomotsi Mompati District Municipality